Alvand (also Romanized as Alwand; also known as Alband and El’vend) is a village in Alvand Rural District of the Central District of Khorramdarreh County, Zanjan province, Iran. At the 2006 National Census, its population was 430 in 85 households. The following census in 2011 counted 362 people in 101 households. The latest census in 2016 showed a population of 380 people in 126 households; it was the largest village in its rural district.

References 

Khorramdarreh County

Populated places in Zanjan Province

Populated places in Khorramdarreh County